Kasim Uddin (died 22 August 1992)  was a veteran folk singer of Bangladesh of Bhawaiya genre. He is reckoned as the greatest Bhawaiya singer after Abbasuddin Ahmed. He is also addressed "The Prince of Bhawaiya". He is considered a cultural icon in Kurigram, where every year on his birth anniversary, 'Kasin Uddin Festival' of folk songs is organised.

References 

20th-century Bangladeshi male singers
20th-century Bangladeshi singers
Bangladeshi folk singers
K
1992 deaths